Devashtich District (before 2016 Ghonchi District) is a district in the center of Sughd Region, Tajikistan, located south of the regional capital Khujand and bordering on Kyrgyzstan to the east. Its capital is Ghonchi (Ganchi in Russian transliteration). The population of the district is 173,500 (January 2020 estimate).

Administrative divisions
They are as follows:

References

Districts of Tajikistan
Sughd Region